Marc Dumitru (born 5 April 1986) is a German actor and singer of Romanian descent. He has one sister and he has made his Abitur in Stockach. The self-styled gateway to Lake Constance, He's school days he found quite casually, especially the time in the theater group, in which he have tried himself in 2001 for the first time. He quickly since realized that his acting is probably his absolute dream job, He had a great time so extreme with any other thing. He really like to play football and a big fan of Bayern team. He is famous for his acting in the German TV-show Das Haus Anubis. He plays the role of Magnus von Hagen, who is the German version of Jeroen Cornelissen and Jerome Clarke. Last year in 2015 in July, Marc appeared in the commercial called " Travian Kingdoms" in German version (ProSieben). He did once go in let's dance in Germany with Kristina Schmidt. He was in the Chris Brenner music video "On the Run" the story was he thought that Kristina did cheat on him, and Kristina tries to find him but she returned him, and they kissed. He was live in RTL Nitro today in Die 24 Stunden vom Nürburgring - Das größte Autorennen der Welt (The Nürburgring 24 Hours - The biggest race of the world) and it is all about racing. In 2018, he married Kristina Schmidt and one of Das Haus Anubis actors, Franziska Alber attend to their wedding. He is Dr. Jan Kühnert in Nachtschwestern.

Media

Discography

Album

External links
 
 Vita Marc Dumitru (in German)
 (in German)

1986 births
Living people
21st-century German male singers
German male television actors
German people of Romanian descent
People from Überlingen
German male film actors